Morizono is a Japanese surname. Notable people with the surname include:

, Japanese table tennis player
, Japanese manga artist
, Japanese table tennis player

Japanese-language surnames